Taht-e Mahall (also Romanized as Taḩt-e Maḩall and Taḩt-e Maḩal, Taḩtmaḩall, and Tehtmahal; also known as Takht-e Maḩall and Takht Mahal) is a village in Pol-e Doab Rural District, Zalian District, Shazand County, Markazi Province, Iran. At the 2006 census, its population was 801, in 213 families.

References 

Populated places in Shazand County